A replicant is a fictional bioengineered humanoid featured in the 1982 film Blade Runner and the 2017 sequel Blade Runner 2049 which is physically indistinguishable from an adult human and often possesses superhuman strength and intelligence. A replicant can be detected by means of the fictional Voight-Kampff test in which emotional responses are provoked; a replicant's nonverbal responses differ from those of a human. Failing the test leads to execution, which is euphemistically referred to as "retiring."

Several models of replicant were produced. The first seen model, the Nexus-6, has a four-year lifespan to prevent them from developing empathic abilities (and, therefore, immunity to the test). The successor model, the Nexus-7, were limited experimental models with the ability to procreate. Nexus-8 and Nexus-9 replicants also have open-ended lifespans, but the Nexus-9 line was incapable of disobeying human orders.

Term origin
In his novel Do Androids Dream of Electric Sheep? (the inspiration for Blade Runner), Philip K. Dick used the term android (or "andy"), but director Ridley Scott wanted a new term to avoid audience preconceptions. As David Peoples was re-writing the screenplay, he consulted his daughter, who was involved in microbiology and biochemistry, who suggested the term "replicating," the biological process of a cell making a copy of itself. From that, either Peoples or Scott came up with replicant, and it was inserted into Hampton Fancher's screenplay.

Fictional history

Blade Runner 
Prior to the events of the film, replicants became illegal on Earth after a bloody off-world mutiny. Six replicants escaped the off-world colonies, killing 23 people and taking a shuttle to Earth; the film focuses on the pursuit of the replicants by Rick Deckard, a type of fictional police officer/bounty-hunter called a "Blade Runner," who investigates, tests, and executes replicants.

Escaped replicants (all Nexus-6 models):
 Roy Batty (played by Rutger Hauer), a self-sufficient combat model for the colonization defence program
 Pris Stratton (played by Daryl Hannah), a "basic pleasure model" for military personnel
 Zhora Salome (played by Joanna Cassidy), "trained for an off-world kick murder squad"
 Leon Kowalski (played by Brion James), a combat model or loader of nuclear fission materials
 An unnamed replicant—"Hodge" in early versions of the screenplay—killed in an electrical field at the Tyrell Corporation
 The sixth replicant was named "Mary" in early versions of the screenplay. The only mention of this replicant occurs in the 2007 "Final Cut" version — Captain Bryant's dialogue has been fixed to say that two replicants were killed by an electric field at the Tyrell Corporation; in previous versions of the film, he states it was only one replicant.

Other replicants:
 Rachael, (played by Sean Young) is a prototype replicant, with implanted memories from Eldon Tyrell's niece. The sequel film further elaborates on this by revealing it was designed as a test run for a replicant that can become pregnant.

While Deckard discusses Rachael with Tyrell, Tyrell states that to better control them, he started to implant false memories to give them the years of experiences that humans take for granted; creating a "cushion or pillow for their emotions."

Nexus-6 units were designed to have a four-year lifespan to avoid emotional development, and all attempts to increase a replicant's lifespan have resulted in death. According to Deckard, a normal replicant can usually be discovered using the Voight-Kampff test within 20–30 questions, though Rachael answers over one hundred questions before Deckard determines she is a replicant.

The second film further develops Rachael's origin, and gives significantly more details about its radical design. It revealed that it was an experimental model of replicant with a high percentage of human organs, including human reproductive organs, and that Rachael conceived a child with Deckard. As Rachael died during childbirth, its possible survival beyond the four years was undetermined.

Blade Runner 2049 
The sequel, Blade Runner 2049, is set thirty years after the original. In the intervening 30 years, several new replicant lines were introduced.

The sequel retroactively establishes that Rachael was part of a short-lived prototype line of replicants designated Nexus-7, which was not only intended as a test to make replicants more mentally stable with implanted memories, but also to develop replicants capable of procreation. Rachael died in childbirth in 2021, and the child was hidden by the replicant underground. Tyrell was killed during the events of the first movie in November 2019, and the secret of producing replicants capable of procreation died with him. 

In 2020, the Tyrell Corporation introduced the Nexus-8 replicant, whose lifespans were not limited to four years. The Nexus-8 went into mass production, but a new wave of replicant rebellions occurred, culminating in rogue Nexus-8 replicants detonating a nuclear weapon in orbit over the western United States to create an electromagnetic pulse. The pulse destroyed most records about replicants, making it difficult for humans to track them down on Earth, but the attack led to mass purges and complete shutdown of Nexus-8 production (though many existing units were able to go into hiding in the chaos).  

In 2036, genetic engineer Niander Wallace designed a new line of Nexus-9 replicants. They also have an open lifespan, but were designed to be unable to resist orders given by a human. The demonstrated effectiveness of Nexus-9 programming, combined with the solving of a global food crisis, allowed for a successful push for the ban on replicant production to be lifted.  

By 2049, Nexus-9 replicants are extensively used across Earth and the off-world colonies. Special police units are tasked with tracking down any that might go rogue, as well as any remaining Nexus-8s still in hiding (Nexus-7 was never mass-produced, and all the Nexus-6 models died of old age decades before). These police units are once again called Blade Runners, but are now composed of self-aware replicants with implanted memories, though they are fully aware that they are replicants and that their memories are artificial.

Ambiguity over Deckard's Humanity

A primary element of the Blade Runner film is the ambiguity over whether the protagonist, Deckard, is a human or a replicant. This ties into one of the central themes of the film: the nature of humanity. Ultimately, the important point is not whether Deckard is a replicant but that the ambiguity blurs the line between humans and replicants.

Creator opinions 
Harrison Ford, who played Deckard in the film, has said that he did not think Deckard is a replicant, and that he and director Ridley Scott had discussions that ended in the agreement that the character was human. 

According to several interviews with director Ridley Scott, Deckard is a replicant. When asked about the possibility of a Blade Runner sequel in October 2012, Scott said, "It's not a rumor—it's happening. With Harrison Ford? I don't know yet. Is he too old? Well, he was a Nexus-6, so we don't know how long he can live. And that's all I'm going to say at this stage." 

Author Will Brooker has written that unicorn dream may not be unique to Deckard and that it may be a personal touch added to some or all of the Nexus-6 replicants' brains. From this, one might also infer that Gaff is a replicant and shares the same embedded memory.

Paul Sammon, author of Future Noir: The Making of Blade Runner, has suggested in interviews that Deckard may be a Nexus-7 model, which possesses no superhuman strength or intelligence but does have neurological features that complete the illusion of humanity. Sammon also suggests that Nexus-7 replicants may not have a set lifespan (i.e., they could be immortal, ruling out the lifespan as a determining trait). He goes on to propose that Scott thought it would be more provocative to imply that Deckard is a replicant.

In-universe evidence 
In Do Androids Dream of Electric Sheep?, Deckard was subjected to the Voight-Kampff test and passed, marking as a human, though Rachael's near-passing the test casts doubt on its infallibility. He collects photographs, yet has no obvious family beyond a reference to his ex-wife (who called him a "cold fish"). The film's Supervising Editor Terry Rawlings remembers that Scott "purposefully put Harrison in the background of the shot, and slightly out of focus, so that you'd only notice his eyes were glowing if you were paying attention...Ridley himself may have definitely felt that Deckard is a replicant, but still, by the end of the picture, he intended to leave it up to the viewer."

The sequel, Blade Runner 2049, revisited the question while leaving the answer deliberately ambiguous. The film reveals that Deckard was able to conceive a child with Rachael, and this was possible because she was an experimental prototype (designated Nexus-7), the first and only attempt to design a replicant model capable of procreation. Niander Wallace, CEO of the company that produced replicants, captures Deckard and muses that his falling in love with Rachael seemed too perfect, suggesting that Deckard was designed to fall in love with Rachael as part of Tyrell's experiment to develop replicants that can procreate, but with Tyrell dead and the records destroyed, he will never know.

References

Further reading
 Glaser, Horst Albert and Rossbach, Sabine: The Artificial Human, Frankfurt/M., Bern, New York 2011. .

Blade Runner (franchise)
Fictional androids
Science fiction themes
Biorobotics in fiction